The Menzies Research Centre Ltd is an Australian public policy think tank. It was founded in 1994 and is named in honour of Sir Robert Menzies, the founder of the Liberal Party of Australia and Australia's longest-serving Prime Minister. It is the think-tank of the Liberal Party of Australia.

The Centre "works to promote the principles of individual liberty, free speech, competitive enterprise, limited government and democracy". The Centre publishes books and monographs, and organises conferences and seminars throughout the year.

Activities
Its activities include:
 consultations and other processes for debating and developing public policy, with a focus on economic, regulatory and energy policy
 the annual John Howard Lecture, given each year by a distinguished international figure, 
 publishing of books in relation to Liberal figures and values (e.g. David Kemp's histories on the development of Australian democracy and liberalism) 
 an active subscription program offering many benefits and opportunities

Directors
The Directors of the Centre are:
 Paul Espie AO – Chair
 Hon John Olsen AO
 Andrew Abercrombie
 Dr Peta Seaton AM
 Mitch Hooke AM
 Brian Loughnane AO
 Hon Andrew Robb AO 
 Hon Nick Minchin AO
 Georgina Downer
 Tamsin Lawrence
 David Gazard
 Meredith Jackson
 Adrian Tembel
 Alex Danne
 Hon Trish Worth AM
 Nick Cater

Former Chairs have been:

 David S. Clarke AO 1995-98
 Hon Andrew Robb MP 1998-2004
 Hon Malcolm Turnbull MP 2002-04
 Tom Harley
 Kevin McCann AO
 Paul Espie AO

Executive Directors of the Menzies Research Centre have been:

 Michael L'Estrange AO 1995-97
 Hon Dr Marlene Goldsmith 1998-2000
 John Roskam 2001-02
 Jason Briant 2003-05
 Julian Leeser 2006-12
 Professor Don Markwell, 2012–13
 Nick Cater, 2014–present

See also 
 Australian Labor Party: Chifley Research Centre
 National Party of Australia: Page Research Centre
 Australian Greens Party The Green Institute

References

Think tanks based in Australia
Liberal Party of Australia
1994 establishments in Australia
Organizations established in 1994
Political and economic think tanks based in Australia